United States generally refers to the United States of America, but there are other countries and groups of countries with "United States" in their name. The list includes countries and groups of countries, that are real, proposed or fictional:

Existing countries
 United Mexican States, the official name of Mexico, an independent state since 1821
 United States of America, the official name of the United States, an independent state since 1776

Historical countries or groups
 United States of Belgium, a confederation that existed during the year 1790
 Republic of the United States of Brazil, the official name of Brazil between 1889 and 1937
 United States of Brazil, the official name of Brazil between 1937 and 1967
 United States of Central America (informal name), or the United Provinces of Central America and the Federal Republic of Central America, in existence from 1823 to 1841
 United States of Colombia, name held by Colombia between 1863 and 1886
 United States of Indonesia, name of the country from 1949 to 1950
 United States of the Ionian Islands, former British protectorate from 1815 to 1864
 United State of Saurashtra, an Indian state between 1948 and 1956
 United States of Stellaland, a short-lived political union of Goshen and Stellaland proper in southern Africa from 1883 to 1885
 United State of Travancore and Cochin, the former Indian state of Travancore-Cochin between 1949 and 1950
 United States of Venezuela, from 1864 to April 15, 1953
United Arab States, confederation of the United Arab Republic and North Yemen between 1958 and 1961

Proposed countries or groups
 United States of Latin Africa, a political entity proposed by Barthélemy Boganda for Central Africa
 United States of China, once advocated before the unification of China by Chiang Kai-shek
 United States of Europe, a political concept of a single European state
 United States of Africa, a political concept similar to the United States of Europe
 United States of South America, a proposed federation in South America or Latin America
 United States of Greater Austria, a successor state to the Austro-Hungarian Empire proposed by Archduke Franz Ferdinand
 United States of Australia, a name suggested before the creation and federation of the Commonwealth of Australia
 United States of Poland, an unrealized political concept of reborn Poland, between 1860 and 1941

Fictional uses
 United States of Canada, a satirically proposed country formed from Canada and the liberal blue states of the U.S., as opposed to Jesusland
 United States of Mexamericanada, a satirical reference in 21st century politics
 United States of the West, the admission of the European countries as states of the U.S., as satirically advocated by Régis Debray in his paper Empire 2.0

United States
United States included